Ridin' High (also released as Freaky) is an album released by Canadian jazz trumpeter Maynard Ferguson featuring tracks recorded in 1967 and originally released on the Enterprise label.

Track listing 
 "The Rise and Fall of Seven" (Tom McIntosh) - 5:51
 "Light Green" (Don Piestrup) - 3:38
 "Kundalini Woman" (Slide Hampton) - 5:21
 "Sunny" (Bobby Hebb) - 3:48
 "Meet a Cheetah" (Don Sebesky) - 4:25
 "Molecules" (Slide Hampton) - 4:34
 "Wack-Wack" (Donald Storball, Eldee Young, Hysear Don Walker, Isaac Red Holt) - 2:46
 "Satan Speaks" (Tom McIntosh) - 2:30
 "Alfie" (Burt Bacharach, Hal David) - 3:00

Personnel 
Maynard Ferguson - trumpet, flugelhorn
Charles Camilleri, Dick Hurwitz, Nat Pavone, Lew Soloff - trumpet
Jimmy Cleveland, Slide Hampton - trombone
George Jeffers - bass trombone, tuba
Dick Spencer - alto saxophone, soprano saxophone
Lew Tabackin, Frank Vicari - tenor saxophone
Pepper Adams - baritone saxophone
Danny Bank - bass saxophone, piccolo
Mike Abene - piano
Joe Beck - guitar
Don Payne - bass
Don McDonald - drums
John Pacheco - congas

References 

1968 albums
Maynard Ferguson albums
Albums produced by Al Bell
Albums arranged by Tom McIntosh
Albums arranged by Don Sebesky
Albums arranged by Slide Hampton